Alexander "Mine Boy" Levinsky (February 2, 1910 – September 1, 1990) was an American-born Canadian professional ice hockey Defenseman who played nine seasons in the National Hockey League for the Toronto Maple Leafs, Chicago Black Hawks and New York Rangers. He was given his unusual nickname because it was noted that his father, who would attend his son's games, would shout: "That's mine boy."

Biography
Levinsky was born in Syracuse, New York, grew up in Toronto, Ontario, and was Jewish. He starred in baseball, basketball, hockey, and football before he concentrated on hockey. Before playing hockey professionally, he played baseball with St. George's; he later played hockey with the Toronto Marlboros.

He played 367 NHL games, in which he scored 19 goals and had 49 assists for 68 career points. He had 2 goals and 1 assist in 37 playoff games.

Lewinsky graduated from the University of Toronto Law School (and played for the Varsity Blues 1929-1930) and later became a lawyer, car dealership owner and bowling alley owner.

Career statistics

Regular season and playoffs

Awards and achievements
1932 Stanley Cup Championship (Toronto Maple Leafs)
1938 Stanley Cup Championship (Chicago Black Hawks)

See also
List of select Jewish ice hockey players

References

External links

1910 births
1990 deaths
20th-century American Jews
American emigrants to Canada
American men's ice hockey defensemen
Canadian ice hockey defencemen
Chicago Blackhawks players
Ice hockey players from New York (state)
Jewish American sportspeople
Jewish Canadian sportspeople
Jewish ice hockey players
New York Rangers players
Sportspeople from Syracuse, New York
Ice hockey people from Toronto
Stanley Cup champions
Toronto Maple Leafs players
Toronto Marlboros players
Toronto Varsity Blues ice hockey players
University of Toronto alumni